Axure RP Pro / Team is a software for creating prototypes and specifications for websites and applications. It offers drag and drop placement, resizing, and formatting of widgets.

Features 
Axure RP supports prototyping rich web applications by mapping desired interface behaviors (such as displaying or hiding an element) in response to actions like mouse clicks or touch gestures. Axure RP generates HTML web sites for preview and team collaboration as well as Microsoft Word documents as output for production documentation.

Axure RP can also connect to other tools and services such as Slack and Microsoft Teams to collaborate. 
Axure RP is also able to auto adjust and move smoothly from macOS to Windows.
For security, prototypes can be sent with password protections to ensure full disclosure.

Users create custom controls by combining existing widgets and assigning actions in response to events such as OnClick, OnMouseOver and OnMouseOut or touch gestures like pinch and swipe. For example, interface panels can have a number of states, each being activated by clicking on an element such as a tab button, list-box item, or action button

Commercialization 
The current version of the software "Axure RP 10" is available as a subscription. Perpetual licenses are supported, but no longer offered. There are three versions: Pro, Team and Enterprise.  The Pro product is available for free to students and teachers, and with discounts to educational institutions. The Team version adds documentation features, including layout control, output to Microsoft Word and Excel, and support for team projects.

Competitors 
 Figma
 Framer

References

External links 
 

Integrated development environments